Hogla (lit. Partridge) is a moshav in central Israel. It is named after Hogla, who settled here in the district of the tribe of Menashe (Joshua 17:3). Located in the coastal plain to the south of Hadera, it falls under the jurisdiction of Hefer Valley Regional Council.

History
The moshav was founded in 1933 by from Bulgarian, Polish and Russian Jewish immigrants.

References

Moshavim
Populated places in Central District (Israel)
Populated places established in 1933
1933 establishments in Mandatory Palestine
Bulgarian-Jewish culture in Israel
Polish-Jewish culture in Israel
Russian-Jewish culture in Israel